Etobicoke Creek is a bus rapid transit station on the Mississauga Transitway in Mississauga, Ontario, Canada. It is located along the north side of Eglinton Avenue at Tahoe Boulevard.

Tahoe and Etobicoke Creek stations opened on February 16, 2016.

References

External links

flickr search for: Mississauga Transitway Etobicoke Creek

Mississauga Transitway
2016 establishments in Ontario